Close Harmony (1929) is an American Pre-Code comedy-drama musical film released by Paramount Pictures.

Plot
A musically talented young woman named Marjorie who is part of a stage show, meets a warehouse clerk named Al West who has put together an unusual jazz band. She becomes interested in him and his work and so manages to use her influence to get him into the program for one of the shows at her theatre company.

The manager, Max Mindel has a dislike towards Marjorie so after discovering her affection towards Al, he gives the band notice and hires harmony singers Barney and Bey as a replacement. Marjorie makes up to both men and soon breaks up the duo, getting rid of the competition. Al learns of her scheme, and makes her confess to the singers of her deeds. Barney and Bey make up, and Max gives Al and his band one more chance. Al is a sensation, and Max offers him a contract for $1,000 a week.

Cast
Charles "Buddy" Rogers - Al West
Nancy Carroll - Marjorie Merwin
Harry Green - Max Mindel
Jack Oakie - Ben Barney
Richard "Skeets" Gallagher - Johnny Bay
Matty Roubert - Bert
Ricca Allen - Mrs. Prosser
Wade Boteler - Officer Kelly
Baby Mack - Syvil
Oscar Smith - George Washington Brown
Greta Granstedt - Eva Larue
Gusztáv Pártos - Gustav (as Gus Partos)
Jesse Stafford - Himself (orchestra leader)

Soundtrack
 "She's So, I Dunno"
Words by Leo Robin
Music by Richard A. Whiting
 "I Wanna Go Places and Do Things"
Words by Leo Robin
Music by Richard A. Whiting
Copyright 1929 by Famous Music Corp.
 "I'm All A-Twitter And All A-Twirl"
Words by Leo Robin
Music by Richard A. Whiting
Copyright 1929 by Famous Music Corp.
 "12th Street Rag"
by Euday L. Bowman
Copyright 1919 by J.W. Jenkins Sons Music Co.

External links

1920s musical comedy-drama films
1929 films
American black-and-white films
American musical comedy-drama films
Films directed by A. Edward Sutherland
Films directed by John Cromwell
Films scored by John Leipold
Paramount Pictures films
1929 directorial debut films
1929 comedy films
1929 drama films
1920s English-language films
1920s American films